Craig Neil Miles (born 20 July 1994) is an English cricketer who currently plays for Warwickshire. A right-handed batsman and right-hand medium pace bowler he made his first-class debut for Gloucestershire against Northamptonshire in May 2011. In doing so, at 16,  he became the fourth youngest player to represent Gloucestershire in a first-class match. Miles signed a three-year contract for Gloucestershire in November 2010, but did not become a full-time professional player until 2013. He was born at Swindon in Wiltshire and studied at South Gloucestershire and Stroud College.

County career
Miles made his first-class debut for Gloucestershire in May 2011 against Northamptonshire as a 16-year-old. In the first innings Miles bowled 19 overs for 80 runs also gaining two wickets. His debut first-class victim was Alex Wakely who was caught by Chris Taylor for 32. He made 19 runs in the Gloucestershire innings from 66 including 2 fours, whilst in the second innings he scored 5 in a heavy innings and 6 runs defeat. Miles made his List A debut against Essex in July 2011. He bowled 7 overs with figures of 2 wickets for 32 runs as Gloucestershire won by 4 wickets. Miles also played in the following game against Lancashire, however bowled just 4 overs and went for 31 runs.

References

External links
 
 Craig Miles Gloucestershire Profile

1994 births
Living people
English cricketers
Gloucestershire cricketers
Warwickshire cricketers
Sportspeople from Swindon
Northern Superchargers cricketers